Location Location Location Australia is an Australian television series originally presented by Bryce Holdaway and Veronica Morgan. It is an adaptation of the British series Location, Location, Location. The series was announced in 2011 and premiered on 11 July 2012. The second series premiered on 28 August 2013. The third series premiered on 12 August 2014.

Derided for the length of its name (13 syllables), the series was nominated for Most Outstanding Lifestyle Program at the 2013 ASTRA Awards. The hosts were chosen for their knowledge of real estate.

In October 2022, the series was revived by Network 10 and will air in 2023. In February 2023, it was announced former contestants and winners of The Block, Mitch Edwards and Mark McKie, will host the series for 10.

Series overview

Episodes

Series 1 (2012)

Series 2 (2013)

Series 3 (2014)

References

2012 Australian television series debuts
2014 Australian television series endings
2023 Australian television series debuts
Australian television series revived after cancellation
Australian non-fiction television series
Lifestyle (Australian TV channel) original programming
Network 10 original programming
Australian television series based on British television series